Moraea serpentina is a flowering plant species in the genus Moraea. It is endemic to the Northern Cape and Western Cape of South Africa.

Distribution 
Moraea serpentina is found from Namaqualand to the Olifants River Valley.

Conservation status 
Moraea serpentina is classified as Least Concern as the population is regarded as stable.

References

External links 
 

Endemic flora of South Africa
Flora of South Africa
Flora of the Cape Provinces
serpentina